Monkeyclaus is a music recording studio and digital music distributor based in Nelson County, Virginia, United States. Started in 1998 by Peter Agelasto, the studio has worked with hundreds of bands from across the US.

References

External links
 Official Monkeyclaus web page

Recording studios in the United States